McRae is an unincorporated community in Covington County, Alabama, United States.

History
A post office operated under the name McRae from 1904 to 1912.

References

Unincorporated communities in Covington County, Alabama
Unincorporated communities in Alabama